The 17th British Academy Film Awards, given by the British Academy of Film and Television Arts in 1964, honoured the best films of 1963.

Winners and nominees

Best Film
 Tom Jones 
8½
Billy Liar
David and Lisa
Hud
Days of Wine and Roses
The Servant
This Sporting Life
To Kill a Mockingbird
Divorce, Italian Style
The Four Days of Naples
Knife in the Water

Best British Film
 Tom Jones 
Billy Liar
The Servant
This Sporting Life

Best Foreign Actor
 Marcello Mastroianni in Divorce, Italian Style 
Howard Da Silva in David and Lisa
Jack Lemmon in Days of Wine and Roses
Paul Newman in Hud
Gregory Peck in To Kill a Mockingbird

Best British Actor
 Dirk Bogarde in The Servant 
Tom Courtenay in Billy Liar
Richard Harris in This Sporting Life
Albert Finney in Tom Jones
Hugh Griffith in Tom Jones

Best British Actress
 Rachel Roberts in This Sporting Life 
Julie Christie in Billy Liar
Sarah Miles in The Servant
Edith Evans in Tom Jones
Barbara Windsor in Sparrows Can't Sing

Best Foreign Actress
 Patricia Neal in Hud 
Lee Remick in Days of Wine and Roses
Daniela Rocca in Divorce, Italian Style
Joan Crawford in What Ever Happened to Baby Jane? 
Bette Davis in What Ever Happened to Baby Jane?

Best British Screenplay
 Tom Jones - John Osborne

Best Animated Film
 Automania 2000 and The Critic

References

Film017
British Academy Film Awards
British Academy Film Awards